Colourful stones (German: Bunte Steine) is the name of six novellas by Adalbert Stifter, published in two volumes in 1853 by Gustav Heckenast in Pest. The subtitle is: Ein Festgeschenk (a present).

In April 2021, a first complete English translation of the work by Isabel Fargo Cole is scheduled to be released by The New York Review of Books.

Editions

Five out of six novellas already existed in preceding editions:

 Granit (Granite) 1848 as Die Pechbrenner (Vergißmeinnicht. Taschenbuch für 1849)
 Kalkstein (Limestone) 1847 as Der arme Wohlthäter (Austria. Österreichischer Universal-Kalender für das Schaltjahr 1848)
 Turmalin 1851 as Der Pförtner im Herrenhause (Libussa. Jahrbuch für 1852)
 Bergkristall (Rock Crystal) 1845 as Der heilige Abend (Die Gegenwart. Politisch literarisches Tageblatt)
 Bergmilch 1843 as Wirkungen eines weißen Mantels (Wiener Zeitschrift für Kunst, Literatur, Theater und Mode)

References 

1853 novels
Austrian novellas
Works by Adalbert Stifter